The 2022 Illinois judicial elections will consist of both partisan and retention elections.

Primaries will be held for partisan elections. The general election will be held on November 8, 2022. These elections will be part of the 2022 Illinois elections.

Supreme Court of Illinois
Justices of the Supreme Court of Illinois are elected by district. Two seats will be holding partisan elections. Originally, two seats will be holding retention elections, however Justice Rita Garman retired on July 7, 2022 and the retention election for her seat was cancelled.

The court has seven seats total separated into five districts. The first district, representing Cook County, contains three seats, making it a multi-member district, while other four districts are single-member districts. Justices hold ten year terms.

On June 4, 2021, Governor J.B. Pritzker signed legislation which redrew the Supreme Court's districts. Before this, the districts had not been redrawn in over five decades. The court had previously been using boundaries created in 1964.

2nd district
In 2020, the 2nd district seat, which had been held by Robert R. Thomas, a Republican, was originally scheduled to have retention election. However, Thomas retired February 29, 2020. On March 1, 2020, Michael J. Burke, a Republican, assumed his seat, and will hold it until a special election in 2022. Under the new maps created by redistricting, Burke's residence is now located in the 3rd district, and he has declared his intention to run in the election to that seat, leaving the 2nd district with an open race.

Democratic primary

Candidates 
Rene Cruz, Kane County Circuit Court judge
Elizabeth Rochford, Lake County Circuit Court judge
Nancy Rotering, mayor of Highland Park, 2018 candidate for Illinois attorney general, 2016 candidate for Illinois's 10th congressional district

Results

Republican primary

Candidates 
Daniel B. Shanes, Lake County Circuit Court judge
Mark C. Curran, former Lake County sheriff (2006–2018) and Republican nominee for U.S. Senate in 2020
Susan F. Hutchinson, Illinois Appellate Court judge
John A. Noverini, Kane County Circuit Court judge

Results

General election

Results

3rd district
In 2020, 3rd district judge Thomas L. Kilbride, a Democrat, lost his retention election. Robert L. Carter, a Democrat, was appointed by the court to hold the seat until a 2022 special election to fill it. Upon his appointment, Carter declared that he did not intend to seek reelection in 2022.

Democratic primary

Candidates
Mary K. O'Brien, Illinois Appellate Court judge and former state representative (1997–2003)

Results

Republican primary

Candidates
Michael J. Burke, incumbent Associate Justice of the 2nd district of the Illinois Supreme Court

Results

General election

Results

Retention elections

Illinois Appellate Court
Illinois Appellate Court justices hold ten-year terms. Retention and partisan elections will be held for several of these positions.

Lower courts

Lower courts will also see judicial elections.

References

Judicial
2022